Hercules and the Hydra is a 1634 painting by Francisco de Zurbarán of Hercules fighting the Lernaean Hydra, now in the Prado Museum in Madrid. It was from a series of the Labours of Hercules for the Hall of Realms in Madrid's Palacio del Buen Retiro.

References

Paintings by Francisco de Zurbarán in the Museo del Prado
1634 paintings
Paintings depicting Heracles